Jack DeWitt (1900–1981) was an American screenwriter.

He wrote a number of films for producer Sandy Howard.

Select filmography
International Lady (1942) 
Beyond the Blue Horizon (1942)
Don Ricardo Returns (1946)
Bells of San Fernando (1947)
 Louisiana (1947)
The Return of Rin Tin Tin (1947)
Louisiana (1947)
Rocky (1948)
Bomba, the Jungle Boy (1949)
Canadian Pacific (1949)
The Lost Volcano (1950)
The Highwayman (1951)
Boston Blackie (1951–53) (TV series) – various episodes
Dick Turpin's Ride (1952)
Fargo (1952)
Big Town (1952) (TV series) – story for 13 episodes
Battles of Chief Pontiac (1952)
Son of Belle Starr (1953)
Gun Belt (1953)
Khyber Patrol(1954)
Sitting Bull (1954)
The Bamboo Prison (1954)
Women's Prison (1955) 
Cell 2455, Death Row (1954) 
Cheyenne (TV series) -episode "The Last Train West" (1956)
Crossroads (1956) (TV series) – episode "The Rabbi Davis Story"
The Beast of Hollow Mountain (1956)
Rumble on the Docks (1956) 
Portland Exposé (1957)
Oregon Passage (1957)
The Gray Ghost (1957–58) – TV series – writer and story supervisor various episodes
Wolf Larsen (1958)
The Purple Gang (1959)
Bronco – episode "Montana Passage" (1960)
Five Guns to Tombstone (1960)
Jack of Diamonds (1967)
One Step to Hell (1968)
A Man Called Horse (1970)
Man in the Wilderness (1971)
The Neptune Factor (1973)
Together Brothers (1974)
Sky Riders (1976)
The Return of a Man Called Horse (1976)
Triumphs of a Man Called Horse (1983) – story

Unmade
The Al Capone Story (1957)
The Coastwatchers (1959)

References

External links
Jack DeWitt at IMDb

1900 births
1981 deaths
20th-century American screenwriters